Easington Fell is a Marilyn in the Forest of Bowland in Lancashire, England. It has been surveyed to be 70 cm higher than a nearby fell of almost identical height, namely, Waddington Fell. This is visible in the background of the photo.

References

Marilyns of England
Hills of the Forest of Bowland
Mountains and hills of Lancashire
Geography of Ribble Valley